Applied Predictive Technologies (APT) was a software company that provided business analytics software, intended to help large, consumer-facing businesses "reduce the risk of any new initiative by systematically testing the idea with a subset of stores, customers, or employees." APT was acquired by Mastercard in 2015 and no longer operates as a standalone business.

History
APT was founded in 1999 by business consulting executives Jim Manzi (Oliver Wyman), Anthony Bruce (McKinsey & Company), and Scott Setrakian (Oliver Wyman). Manzi explained to The Washington Post that "a lot of the work I was doing as a consultant was very repetitive. I realized how much of it could be put into a software model.” With venture capital from Devon Partners, it took Manzi and Bruce less than a year to develop and launch APT’s software tool. In 2006, the firm was backed by Accel-KKR, a private equity firm. In 2013, Goldman Sachs invested $100 million in APT.

APT was acquired by Mastercard in 2015.

Software
APT's (now Mastercard's) software takes a statistically rigorous test and learn approach to business analytics, in which proposed changes are tried out on a small scale and then analyzed before being implemented everywhere. APT's approach follows a larger business trend, evidence-based management, in which the scientific method is applied to business decision making. APT's software automates the cycle described by the Harvard Business Review:
 Create a hypothesis
 Design a test to gather information about the hypothesis
 Execute the test
 Analyze the test to determine how successful it was and what factors explain performance differences
 Plan the rollout based on the analysis of the test

In February 2011, APT was awarded a patent that protects its core analytic technology for designing an in-market test and on matching test stores to control stores.
APT has since lost its key patent when it was invalidated in 2020 by the US District Court.

Competitors
MarketDial, a Utah-based company founded in 2016 by ex-BCG and -McKinsey consultants, is a direct competitor in this space. In 2018 Mastercard / APT brought a lawsuit against its only competitor. After the court significantly trimmed the case, a MarketDial representative commented: "This order, along with the court's previous order dismissing APT's patent infringement claims against MarketDial, reinforce our belief that APT brought this case to stifle legitimate competition and to drive an upstart competitor from the market. MarketDial looks forward to being fully vindicated as the case proceeds." The litigation is still ongoing in a federal district court in Utah and MarketDial continues to operate without hinderance. As noted above, APT has lost its key patent because of this action. The court is considering levying sanctions against Mastercard and / or its counsel for alleged illegal blocking of discovery.

See also
 Test and learn

References

Software companies based in Virginia
Privately held companies based in Virginia
Software companies established in 1999
Companies based in Arlington County, Virginia
1999 establishments in Virginia
Defunct software companies of the United States